Broderick Park is a park situated along the Niagara River in Buffalo, New York, United States.

Location and recreational opportunities

Broderick Park, following an elongated shape, is located on the southern tip of Unity Island between the Niagara River and the Black Rock Canal. The park overlooks the Canada–US border and is situated within view of the Peace Bridge, which links the State of New York with the Canadian Province of Ontario at Fort Erie.

Broderick Park offers recreational facilities for local residents and visitors. Under the Buffalo Micro Parks system within the City of Buffalo, contribution is made toward the maintenance and improvement of amenities.

Historical significance to Underground Railroad

Given the park's proximity to Canada, it is historically important in that it served as a transit area for African-Americans heading for the border on the opposite side of the Niagara River from the park. The park occupies an area that once housed docks for the Black Rock Ferry, which is known to have transported fugitive slaves to Canada as part of the Underground Railroad.

These activities were particularly precipitated by the passage of the Fugitive Slave Law of 1850, which to some measure brought about the 'nationalizing' of some of the consequences of the slavery practiced in the Southern states, and hence the increased flow of African-Americans travelers seeking liberty in Canada. Ironically it was Buffalo's own Millard Fillmore who, as President of the United States, signed this measure into law. (See also: Millard Fillmore - Policies.)

After the American Civil War period and the Emancipation Proclamation, the Park ceased to have the same clandestine focus for traveling African-Americans.

Reenactments and commemorations

Reenactments and commemorations of Underground Railroad events have been regularly held at Broderick Park under the sponsorship of Buffalo Quarters Historical Society. In 2010, Broderick Park was recognized by the U.S. National Park Service as a National Underground Railroad Network to Freedom site.

Recent developments

Broderick Park — visibly close to the Peace Bridge — has sometimes been used as a backdrop to public meetings on subjects of law and administrative reform as they may relate to cross-border issues.

In 2008, funding shortfalls led to an unsuccessful proposal calling for Broderick Park to be transferred from the City of Buffalo to the State of New York, to become part of a future state park.

In 2012, plans were announced for a $1.5 million revitalization of the park, with plans for a new amphitheater, improved facilities, and a new memorial celebrating the park's involvement in the Underground Railroad. The project commenced in 2013.

See also

 Canada–United States border
 Underground Railroad
 Fugitive Slave Law - Effects
 Black Rock - History
 Fort Erie - Underground Railroad
 List of crossings of the Niagara River
 Niagara River - Islands

References

External links
Niagara River Greenway Commission - Broderick Park Master Plan

Neighborhoods in Buffalo, New York
Underground Railroad locations
Tourist attractions in Buffalo, New York
Parks in Erie County, New York
African-American history in Buffalo, New York